Cathryn Sullivan (born April 5, 1956) is an American acting coach who specializes in working with young performers. She is the founder and director of the Cathryn Sullivan Acting for Film Studio in Lewisville, Texas. Sullivan has worked with performers like Demi Lovato, Selena Gomez, Debby Ryan, Thomas Mann and Hayley Orrantia.

Career
Cathryn Sullivan began the craft of acting as a teenager doing speech tournaments and lead stage roles in high school, college and community theater. "I took professional classes for several years from many teachers, but I never felt like I was being taught how to "GROW" as an actress. I finally found one brilliant and gifted teacher who really knew how to teach actors how to improve their craft. After taking from him for three years, three times a week and working in the film industry for a while, I became his partner and began teaching film and TV seminars to adults and children".   She taught in Coppell for 9 years teaching at Everybody Fits, then opened her own studio in Lewisville, Texas. Every year, there are several of her students who begin reaching their dreams. Because of this, she has students who come from all over the country to take her classes (Wisconsin, Miami, Kansas, Chicago, Virginia, etc.) and even the world including Thailand and China!

Cathryn coaches children, teen actors and young adults and has taught many stars (all who've taken from her for several years) that include Demi Lovato, Selena Gomez (Wizards of Waverly Place, Romona, Monti-Carlo, Princess Protection Program), Thomas Mann, Madison Pettis Jackson Pace (a regular in the Emmy & Golden Globe-award-winning "Homeland"), Logan Henderson (Big Time Rush) & her son Cody Linley (Hannah Montana, Dancing with the Stars, Hoot) and continues to stay in touch with all of them-even today.

Family
Sullivan is the mother of actor Cody Linley, known for his recurring role as Jake Ryan in the television series Hannah Montana and for being a contestant on the seventh season of Dancing With The Stars, in which he was partnered with Julianne Hough. and Chad Linley, who died on August 4, 2011. He was 29 years old.

Former students
 Demi Lovato
 Selena Gomez
 Debby Ryan
 Cody Linley
 Hayley Orrantia
 Thomas Mann
 Bryce Gheisar  
 Madison Pettis
 Jackson Pace
 Logan Henderson  
 Olivia Scott Welch
 Logan Miller
 Bryce Cass
 Gavin Casalegno
 Jennifer Stone

References

External links
  Official Website
 Good Morning Texas Interview with Cathryn Sullivan
  Dallas Observer Article on Demi Lovato

American acting coaches
Living people
1956 births